Ericeia elongata is a moth in the  family Erebidae. It is found from the Indo-Australian tropics to New Guinea and Australia (Queensland). The habitat consists of lowland forests, including heath and alluvial forests.

The larvae possibly feed on Acacia species.

Taxonomy
The species was formerly included in Ericeia inangulata as a synonym.

References

Moths described in 1929
Ericeia